Steven Hall (born 16 January 2005), is an Australian professional footballer who plays as a goalkeeper for Adelaide United. He is the youngest goalkeeper in A-League Men history having made his debut at just 16 years and 350 days.

References

External links

2005 births
Living people
Australian soccer players
Association football goalkeepers
Adelaide City FC players
Adelaide United FC players
National Premier Leagues players
A-League Men players